Engro Corporation (Engro), is a conglomerate headquartered in Karachi.

Founded as a fertilizer business in 1965, it is one of the largest companies in the country that employs over 2,600 individuals across the Group and has operations in a diverse range of businesses. With a core purpose to solve the pressing issues in Pakistan, Engro operates through the following four verticals: Food & Agriculture, Energy & Related Infrastructure, Petrochemicals, and Telecommunication Infrastructure.

Significant Engro subsidiaries include Engro Fertilizers, Engro Eximp Agriproducts, Engro Eximp FZE, Engro Energy, Engro Powergen Qadirpur, Engro Powergen Thar, Engro Elengy Terminal, Engro Vopak Terminal, Engro Polymer & Chemicals and Engro Enfrashare. 

Further, the notable Associate/ joint venture companies include FrieslandCampina Engro and Sindh Engro Coal Mining Company.

History

In 1957, Esso-Mobil discovered the region’s largest gas reserves within the Mari District.

In 1965, the company was founded as a fertilizer business by an American company Esso on the Mari Gas field near Daharki, Ghotki District, Sindh, with 75% of the shares owned by Esso and 25% by the general public. 

The construction of a urea plant commenced at Daharki in 1966 and production began in 1968. At the US $43 million with an annual production capacity of 173,000 tons, it was the single largest foreign investment by a multinational corporation in Pakistan at the time.

Following the global name change of Esso to Exxon, it was decided to rename the company to Exxon Chemical Pakistan in 1978.

In 1991, Exxon divested its fertilizer business on a global basis. The employees of Exxon Chemical Pakistan Limited, in partnership with leading international and local financial institutions, bought out Exxon's 75% equity. This is still perhaps the most successful employee buy-out in the country's corporate history and, subsequently, the company was renamed as Engro Chemical Pakistan Limited.

In 2010, Engro Chemical Pakistan Limited renamed itself Engro Corporation. Engro also adopted a logo change to reflect a uniform brand identity across its diverse businesses.

Leadership
Ghias Khan was appointed as the 4th President & CEO of Engro Corporation at the end of 2016. 
Previous CEOs of Engro Corporation include:
 Khalid Siraj Subhani (2015 - 2016)
 Ali Ansari (2012 - 2015)
 Asad Umar (2004 - 2012)

Engro's Board of Directors includes one executive director, four independent directors, and five non-executive directors. Prominent entrepreneur, businessman, and philanthropist, Hussain Dawood have been the Engro Corporation Chairman since 2006.

Group Companies

Food & Agriculture
Engro Fertilizers is the second-largest fertilizer manufacturing company in Pakistan. It has the widest portfolio of products and services, covering the full Seed-To-Harvest spectrum with a continuous focus on balanced crop nutrition and increased crop yields. It commissioned the world's largest single-train urea plant – EnVen - in 2011, one of Pakistan's largest private sector industrial investments. 
For Supply Chain operations, Engro Fertilizers limited owns the fleet of around 200 containers and flatbed trucks which is operated by their subsidiary called Engro Logistics.
Engro Logistics claims to be the safest road Logistics transport service in Pakistan with minimum rate of incidents.

Engro Eximp Agriproducts is one of Pakistan's largest basmati rice exporter, with USD 20 million worth of exports in 2020 alone. It operates an integrated plant for processing rice and has a 70,000MT per annum production capacity and Asia's largest paddy cleaning and drying capacity. 

Established in 2006, FrieslandCampina Engro (branded as Engro Foods until July 2019) is a joint venture with Royal FrieslandCampina, and the second-largest dairy company in Pakistan. Its brands Tarang, Olpers, Omung, and Omoré are all leading brands in the national dairy market. Their products are widely distributed across Pakistan.

Energy & Related Infrastructure
Engro Energy Limited owns and operates Engro Powergen Qadirpur Limited, a 217-megawatt power plant and Engro’s first initiative in the power sector. Engro Powergen Qadirpur Limited was listed on the Karachi Stock Exchange in October 2014 where 25% of the shares were offered. Engro Energy also holds Engro Powergen Thar, Engro Energy Services, and Sindh Engro Coal Mining Company. 

Engro Elengy Terminal (EETL), a joint venture between Engro Corporation and Royal Vopak of the Netherlands, is the first Liquified Natural Gas (LNG) terminal of Pakistan that started operations in March 2015. Built in a world record time of 332 days, EETL is recognized as one of the fastest built and most utilized re-gasification terminals in the world. It currently fulfills as much as 12% of domestic daily natural gas requirements.

Petrochemicals
Engro Polymer & Chemicals is the first and only fully-integrated Chlor-vinyl complex in the country, and is a joint venture with Mitsubishi. It is the sole manufacturer of PVC resin and produces Chlor Alkali products like Caustic Soda, Sodium Hypochlorite, and Hydrochloric Acid. It is involved in the manufacturing, marketing, and distribution of PVC (under the brand name ‘SABZ’) and other quality Chlor-Vinyl allied products. 

Engro Vopak Terminal serves for storage of bulk liquid chemicals and LPG - with an expanded capacity of 82,400 cubic meters. It is a joint venture with Royal Vopak of the Netherlands.

Telecommunication Infrastructure
Engro Enfrashare started operations in late 2018, and operates more than 1,500 towers all over Pakistan. In 2019, Engro Corporation announced an investment of up to Rs 7.5 billion in Engro Enfrashare to develop potential business opportunities in the telecommunications sector and accelerate the development of the country’s connectivity infrastructure.

Global Partnerships
Engro established two joint ventures: one with Royal Vopak of the Netherlands in 1997, creating Engro Vopak Terminal, and another with Mitsubishi, called Engro Polymer & Chemicals. Engro Foods was established in 2005 and now has shareholding by FrieslandCampina, thus renamed FrieslandCampina Engro.

The group continues to venture into businesses with global leaders in their fields like General Electric, China Machinery Engineering Corporation, Siemens, and World Bank’s International Finance Corporation.

Philanthropy
Engro has created long-term social capital by investing into communities using its expertise and resources. Social investment programs are managed by Engro Foundation – the single CSR arm for all Engro companies. 
In 2012, Engro Foundation launched its annual flagship initiative, “I Am The Change” Awards intended to pay tribute to local change agents who have worked tirelessly to improve the living standards for Pakistan’s poorest of the poor. In 2020, the Foundation also signed a three-year memorandum of cooperation with the Bill and Melinda Gates Foundation to promote the well-being of vulnerable and marginalised segments of society. In collaboration with partners such as USAID, Australian Government Department of Foreign Affairs and Trade (DFAT) and DEG of German Federal Ministry for Economic Cooperation and Development, Engro Foundation has executed programs to promote female literacy, vocational trade, entrepreneurship and vital life skills.

See also 
List of largest companies in Pakistan

References

 1991 mergers and acquisitions
 Chemical companies established in 1965
 Companies based in Karachi
 Companies listed on the Pakistan Stock Exchange
 Companies of Sindh
 Conglomerate companies of Pakistan
Dawood Hercules Corporation
 
 Multinational companies headquartered in Pakistan
 Pakistani brands
 Pakistani companies established in 1965